Mylochromis is a genus of haplochromine cichlids endemic to Lake Malawi in Eastern Africa.

Species
There are currently 21 recognized species in this genus:
 Mylochromis anaphyrmus (W. E. Burgess & H. R. Axelrod, 1973)
 Mylochromis balteatus (Trewavas, 1935)
 Mylochromis chekopae G. F. Turner & Howarth, 2001
 Mylochromis ensatus G. F. Turner & Howarth, 2001
 Mylochromis epichorialis (Trewavas, 1935)
 Mylochromis ericotaenia (Regan, 1922)
 Mylochromis formosus (Trewavas, 1935)
 Mylochromis gracilis (Trewavas, 1935) (Torpedostripe Haplochromis)
 Mylochromis guentheri (Regan, 1922)
 Mylochromis incola (Trewavas, 1935) (Golden Mola Hap)
 Mylochromis labidodon (Trewavas, 1935)
 Mylochromis lateristriga (Günther, 1864) (Basket Hap)
 Mylochromis melanonotus (Regan, 1922) (Yellow Black Line Hap)
 Mylochromis melanotaenia (Regan, 1922)
 Mylochromis mola (Trewavas, 1935) (Mola Hap)
 Mylochromis mollis (Trewavas, 1935) (Softy hap)
 Mylochromis obtusus (Trewavas, 1935)
 Mylochromis plagiotaenia (Regan, 1922)
 Mylochromis semipalatus (Trewavas, 1935)
 Mylochromis sphaerodon (Regan, 1922) (Roundtooth Hap)
 Mylochromis spilostichus (Trewavas, 1935)

References

 

Cichlid genera
Taxa named by Charles Tate Regan
Taxonomy articles created by Polbot